Juniperus procera (known by the common English names African juniper, African pencil-cedar, East African juniper, East African-cedar, and Kenya-cedar) is a coniferous tree native to mountainous areas in Africa and the Arabian Peninsula. It is a characteristic tree of the Afromontane flora.

Description
Juniperus procera is a medium-sized tree reaching  (rarely ) tall, with a trunk up to  diameter and a broadly conical to rounded or irregular crown. It is largely dioecious with separate male and female plants, but some individual plants produce both sexes. The cones are berry-like, 4–8 mm in diameter, blue-black with a whitish waxy bloom, and contain 2–5 seeds; they mature in 12–18 months. The male cones are 3–5 mm long, and shed their pollen in early spring.

Distribution
Juniperus procera is native to the Arabian Peninsula (in Saudi Arabia and Yemen), and northeastern, eastern, west-central, and south tropical Africa (in the Democratic Republic of the Congo, the Republic of the Congo, Djibouti, Eritrea, Ethiopia, Kenya, Malawi, Mozambique, Somalia, Somaliland, Sudan, Tanzania, Uganda, Zambia, and Zimbabwe).

It is the only juniper to occur south of the equator, and is thought to be a relatively recent colonist of Africa; the species shows very little of the variability associated with a long period of evolution. It is closely related to Juniperus excelsa from southwestern Asia, probably deriving from a common ancestor with that species in southwestern Asia.

Taxonomy
According to Tropicos, Juniperus procera was originally described and published in Synopsis Coniferarum 1847. The type specimen was collected from Ethiopia, by "Schimper" (possibly Wilhelm Philipp Schimper, but there were other contemporary collectors with this surname).

Uses
It is an important timber tree, used for building houses, poles, and furniture. The bark is used for beehives.

References

Further reading
Adams, R. P. (2004). Junipers of the World: The genus Juniperus. Victoria: Trafford.

External links

procera
Afromontane flora
Flora of Northeast Tropical Africa
Flora of East Tropical Africa
Flora of South Tropical Africa
Flora of Saudi Arabia
Trees of the Arabian Peninsula
Trees of Ethiopia
Trees of the Democratic Republic of the Congo
Ethiopian Highlands
Plants described in 1847
Dioecious plants